Colasposoma tinantae is a species of leaf beetle of the Democratic Republic of the Congo, Zambia and Malawi. It was first described by the Belgian entomologist  in 1941.

References 

tinantae
Beetles of the Democratic Republic of the Congo
Insects of Zambia
Insects of Malawi
Beetles described in 1941